The Philadelphia Handicap was an American Thoroughbred horse race held thirty-eight times between 1913 and 1950 at Havre de Grace Racetrack in Havre de Grace, Maryland. Run on dirt, the race was open to horses of either sex age three and older.

From inception in 1913 through 1919, and again from 1947 through 1950, the event was contested at a sprint distance of six furlongs. In between, it was raced at a mile and a sixteenth.

Historical notes
First run on April 26, 1913, Ten Point easily won the inaugural edition of the Philadelphia Handicap while equaling the track record despite giving weight to the rest of the field. Ten Point went on the run second in the May 10 Kentucky Derby.

In 1919 Commander J. K. L. Ross got the first of his three Philadelphia Handicap wins when Billy Kelly won for him. A gelding Billy Kelly's outstanding career would lead to induction into the U.S. Racing Hall of Fame. Five other horses would also have Hall of Fame careers beginning with Exterminator (1923) then Sun Beau (1931), two-time winner Equipoise (1933-1934), Challedon (1942) and Armed who broke the track record in winning the 1946 race.    

Billy Kelly returned to compete in the 1920 Philadelphia Handicap along with stablemate Sir Barton who had won the 1919 U. S. Triple Cown. The race would see an astonishing upset when 106-1 longshot Crystal Ford came home ahead of the nine other runners. Star Master finished second in front of the third and fourth place finishers Billy Kelly and Sir Barton who were giving the winner 32 and 26 pounds, respectively.

Thanksgiving, a very good runner owned by Anne Corning, had already won a number of top races including the prestigious Travers Stakes when he won the 1939 Philadelphia Handicap. Thanksgiving's trainer was Mary Hirsch, someone who had overcome many obstacles to become the first woman in the United States licensed to train Thoroughbred racehorses. Mary Hirsch was the only female trainer to win the Philadelphia Handicap and through 2019 remains the only female trainer to have won the Travers Stakes. 

World War II saw racing restricted in the United States and Havre de Grace Racetrack was forced to cancel all of its spring races in 1943 which included the Philadelphia Handicap.

In 1945 the Philadelphia Handicap was run at Pimlico Race Course due to Federal government wartime gasoline rationing that saw all four of Maryland's major racetracks consolidate their races into the Pimlico facility.

The following year the distance was changed to a six furlong sprint and was won by another Calumet horse, Pep Well, who was ridden by Albert Snider.  Until his untimely death on March 5, 1948, Snider was the regular jockey for the great Citation and had won all nine races he was aboard. Snider was scheduled to ride in the May 1, 1948 Kentucky Derby but after his death Eddie Arcaro was hired to ride Citation and would win that year's Triple Crown.

On April 19, 1950, The Pincher won what would turn out to be the last running of the Philadelphia Handicap as horse racing came to an end at the Havre de Grace Racetrack at the close of that 1950 spring meeting.

Records
Speed record:
 1:10 2/5 @ 6 furlongs: Pep Well (1947)
 1:43 1/5 @ 1 1/16 miles Armed (1946)

Most wins:
 2 - Boniface (1921, 1922) 
 2 - Equipoise (1933, 1934)
 2 - Pep Well  (1947, 1949)

Most wins by a jockey:
 3 - Maurice Peters  (1936, 1939, 1940)

Most wins by a trainer:
 3 - Henry McDaniel (1921, 1922, 1923)

Most wins by an owner:
 3 - J. K. L. Ross (1919, 1921, 1922)
 3 - Calumet Farm (1946, 1947, 1949)

Winners

References

Discontinued horse races
Havre de Grace Racetrack
Horse races in Maryland
Recurring sporting events established in 1913
Recurring sporting events disestablished in 1951
Havre de Grace, Maryland